Colpbol is a team sport invented in 1997 by Sevilla physical education teacher  Juanjo Bendicho. Colpbol is characterized by its great dynamism, integration and egalitarianism, with all team members having equal importance, and with mixed gender teams the rule rather than the exception.

Colp has spread from Valencia to the rest of Spain and to some countries in South America. There is a youth Colpbol league in Spain with more than 30000 participants.

External links 
 
 
 Conselleria de Educación-Generalitat Valenciana
 Reportaje en web Nostresport
 Periódico Las Provincias-presentación libro sobre el Colpbol
 Presentación balón reglamentario
Comunidad Valenciana

Team sports
Games and sports introduced in 1997
Ball games